The 2010 European Marathon Cup was the 9th edition of the European Marathon Cup of athletics and were held in Barcelona, Spain, inside of the 2010 European Championships.

Results

See also
2010 European Athletics Championships – Men's Marathon
2010 European Athletics Championships – Women's Marathon

References

External links
 EAA web site

European Marathon Cup
European
2010 in European sport
International athletics competitions hosted by Spain
2010 in Spanish sport
Marathon